Veľká Lodina is a village and municipality in Košice-okolie District in the Kosice Region of eastern Slovakia.

History
In historical records the village was first mentioned in 1423.

Geography
The village lies at an altitude of 259 metres and covers an area of 19.699 km². It has a population of about 250 people.

Ethnicity
The population is almost entirely Slovak in ethnicity.

External links

Villages and municipalities in Košice-okolie District
Šariš